The Cleveland Way is a National Trail in the historic area of Cleveland in North Yorkshire, northern England. It runs  between Helmsley and the Brigg at Filey, skirting the North York Moors National Park.

History 

Development of the Cleveland Way began in the 1930s when the Teesside Ramblers' Association pressed for the creation of a long-distance path in the north-east of Yorkshire linking the Hambleton Drove Road, the Cleveland escarpment and footpaths on the Yorkshire coast. Subsequently, in 1953, a formal proposal to create the route was submitted to the North Riding of Yorkshire Council by the National Parks Commission. The trail was officially opened in 1969. It was the second official National Trail to be opened.

Route 

The trail can be walked in either direction linking the trailheads of Helmsley and Filey in a horseshoe configuration. The trail is waymarked along its length using the standard National Trail acorn symbol.

The trail falls into two roughly equal sections.  The inland section leads west from Helmsley, then north, then east around the west of the North York Moors National Park. It then leaves the National Park near Guisborough to meet the coast at Saltburn. It re-enters the National Park just north of Staithes; the coastal section follows the coast from Saltburn to Whitby, then leaves the National Park for the final time at Cloughton Wyke to reach Scarborough and Filey.

Flora and fauna 

The moorland sections of the trail provide a habitat for species including red grouse, curlews and emperor moth caterpillars. The coastal sections may provide sightings of seabirds such as great cormorants, shags, Atlantic puffins, common guillemots and herring gulls.

Connecting trails 

The Cleveland Way connects with various other long-distance footpaths. These are listed in order from Helmsley to Filey.

The Ebor Way goes from Ilkley (where it connects with the Dales Way) to Helmsley. The White Rose Walk from Kilburn White Horse to Roseberry Topping crosses the Cleveland Way. The whole coastal section of the Cleveland Way forms part of the North Sea Trail. The route of the White Rose Way follows the same coastal section. The Esk Valley Walk from Castleton ends at Whitby. The Coast to Coast Walk starts or ends at Robin Hood's Bay, and the Lyke Wake Walk crosses the moors from Osmotherley to Ravenscar.

The Tabular Hills Walk, a regional route developed by the North York Moors National Park Authority, links the two southerly ends of the Cleveland Way, enabling walkers to walk the complete perimeter of the North York Moors National Park.

The Yorkshire Wolds Way goes from Filey to Hessle, near Hull, where it connects with the Trans Pennine Trail which forms part of the European walking route E8.

Races 
The Hardmoors Race Series features ultramarathons, marathons and shorter races based on the Cleveland Way route. Included in the ultramarathon series are a 110-mile race circumnavigating the entire length of the Cleveland Way, and a 55-mile and 60-mile race which race between Helmsley and Guisborough, and Guisborough and Filey respectively in differing directions. There are also longer routes which link up to other trails including the Yorkshire Wolds Way.

Circular walks 

Official circular walks along the Cleveland Way include:
 Ravenscar Round
 Great Ayton Try a Trail
 Osmotherley and the Drovers Road

References

External links 

 
 Long Distance Walkers Association

Footpaths in North Yorkshire
Long-distance footpaths in England
Coastal paths in England
North York Moors
Yorkshire coast